Maksim Aleksandrovich Kuzmin (born 1 June 1996) is a Russian professional football player who plays as a central midfielder for FC Baltika Kaliningrad.

Club career
He made his professional debut on 30 May 2015 for FC Dynamo Moscow in a Russian Premier League game against FC Krasnodar.

On 2 July 2019, he signed a two-year contract with FC Baltika Kaliningrad.

Career statistics

References

External links
 

1996 births
Sportspeople from Samara, Russia
Living people
Russian footballers
Association football midfielders
Russia youth international footballers
FC Dynamo Moscow players
FC Fakel Voronezh players
FC Baltika Kaliningrad players
Russian Premier League players
Russian First League players